Georg Antonius Brustad (23 November 1892 – 17 March 1932) was a Norwegian gymnast who competed in the 1912 Summer Olympics. He was also Norway's first professional boxer, boxing a total of 22 matches as a professional.

He was a member of the Norwegian gymnastics team which won the bronze medal in the gymnastics men's team, Swedish system event. Brustad died from a brain tumour in 1932.

References

External links
profile

1892 births
1932 deaths
Norwegian male artistic gymnasts
Norwegian boxers
Gymnasts at the 1912 Summer Olympics
Olympic gymnasts of Norway
Olympic bronze medalists for Norway
Olympic medalists in gymnastics
Medalists at the 1912 Summer Olympics
20th-century Norwegian people